Schroder Oriental Income Fund is a British investment trust that invests in businesses which derive a significant proportion of their revenues from the Asia Pacific region. Established in 2005, the company is a constituent of the FTSE 250 Index. The chairman is Peter Rigg and the fund is managed by Schroders.

References

External links
 Official site

Financial services companies established in 2005
Investment trusts of the United Kingdom